Between Two Waves is a play by Australian playwright Ian Meadows. It was first produced by Griffin Theatre Company in 2012.

Plot
Daniel - a climatologist and advisor to the government - loses a lifetime of research in a flood. When Fiona tells Daniel they’re about to start a family, Daniel must choose between what he can predict and what he can't.

First Production
Between Two Waves was first produced by Griffin Theatre Company at the SBW Stables Theatre, Sydney, on 5 October 2012, with the following cast:
 JIMMY: Chum Ehelepola
 GRENELLE: Rachel Gordon
 DANIEL: Ian Meadows
 FIONA: Ash Ricardo

 Director, Sam Strong
 Dramaturg, Tahli Corin
 Assistant Director, Mackenzie Steele
 Designer, David Fleischer
 Lighting Designer, Matthew Marshall
 Sound Designer and Composer, Steve Francis
 Audio-Visual Designer, Steve Toulmin

Between Two Waves was developed with the Griffin Theatre Company with assistance from Screen NSW.

References

Australian plays
2012 plays